Of Shark and Man is a feature documentary by the award-winning U.K. based film-maker David Diley, telling the story of Shark Reef in Fiji where divers can come face to face with up to a hundred of the world's biggest bull sharks on one dive. Shark Reef in Fiji was described by underwater filmmakers Ron Taylor and Valerie Taylor as "the best shark dive in the world." Of Shark and Man was released on June 29, 2017, distributed by Shami Media Group. Of Shark and Man is Diley's first feature documentary and is the first in a series of films documenting the relationship between sharks and humans around the world. Of Shark and Man has received eight award nominations, winning five.

Story 
David Diley is a thirty-two-year-old man, trapped in a dead end job in England's industrial north and his life is going nowhere. The film follows David as he leaves this life behind to travel to Fiji and tell the story of Shark Reef in Fiji, a reef which fifteen years earlier had been completely fished out, left devoid of life, only to be completely regenerated by the return of sharks. Of Shark and Man follows David's journey over the course of a month as he makes his way further and further into the sharks realm, culminating in a final dive within a school of sixty of the world's biggest bull sharks.

Production 
Production of the film began in 2011 with a handful of sequences filmed in Manchester, England before the production team, consisting David Diley, Hamish Harper and Hugh Fairs, traveled to Pacific Harbour on the island of Viti Levu, Fiji for a period of four weeks.

Production in Fiji included fifty two dives on Shark Reef which is a permanent or temporary home to eight species of shark: bull shark, tiger shark, sicklefin lemon shark, tawny nurse shark, grey reef shark, whitetip reef shark, blacktip reef shark and silvertip shark. On-location shooting in Fiji began on July 11, 2011 and wrapped on August 10th of the same year.

Post production 
Post production on the film started in August 2011, taking almost four years to complete, the picture lock being confirmed in May 2015. David Diley edited the film himself with Sound Design created by U.S. based producer, composer and sound designer David Lawrie. Various musicians contributed and composed music for the soundtrack including David Lawrie, Krimewave, G-Productions, Before The Beginning, David Diley, Mark Burrows, Chris Zabriskie, Shields and Haruko. The Director's cut of the film was originally 98 minutes in length, later being cut to 84 minutes for international release.

The film was edited on Adobe Premiere Pro CS6 and graded on Da Vinci Resolve.

Festival awards and nominations
 Winner - “Best Cinematography in a Documentary” (Berlin International Film-Maker Festival 2016)
 Winner - “Best Editing in a Documentary” (Nice International Film Festival 2016)
 Winner - “Best Sound Design” (Nice International Film Festival 2016)
 Winner - “Best Film – Organisers Choice” (Cine Submarino des Aguimes 2015)
 Winner - “Best Film – Audience Choice” (Cine Submarino des Aguimes 2015)
 Nominated - “Best Director of a Feature Documentary” (Berlin International Film-Maker Festival 2016)
 Nominated - “Best Science and Education Film” (Berlin International Film-Maker Festival 2016)
 Nominated - “Best Cinematography in a Documentary” (Nice International Film Festival 2016)

Release 
Of Shark and Man was premiered to an invitation only audience on August 27, 2015 at The Courthouse Hotel Theatre in Soho, England. The film was then picked up by Shami Media Group for international distribution in April of the following year. Of Shark and Man was finally released on June 29, 2017.

Critical reception 
Of Shark and Man has been widely praised for its content and creative approach to documentary film-making, with Taryll Baker at UK Film Review writing in his five star review, "Not only is it a remarkable film, showcasing a side to sharks we’ve never seen, it’s an entertaining, grounded and informative experience. We hear from divers, biologists and shark experts. It’s ambitious, but it’s also ambiguous." The film has also received five star ratings from Deeper Blue, Amazon UK and Amazon US

References

External links
 
 

2015 films
British documentary films
2015 documentary films
Documentary films about fish
Films about sharks
2010s British films